Andrei Nikolaevich Bykanov (born Moscow, 25 May 1980) is a Russian rugby union player. He plays as a scrum-half.

Bykanov plays for Slava Moscow, in the Rugby Premier League.

He had 9 caps for Russia, from 2003 to 2011, without ever scoring. He had his debut at the 43-34 loss to Japan, at 25 May 2003, in Tokyo, for the Super Powers Cup. He was called for the 2011 Rugby World Cup, playing a single game, at the 62-12 loss to Ireland, at 25 September 2011, in Rotorua, without scoring. That would be his last cap for his national team.

References

External links
Andrei Bykanov International Statistics

1980 births
Living people
Russian rugby union players
Russia international rugby union players
Rugby union scrum-halves
Slava Moscow players
Sportspeople from Moscow